Rahm is an unincorporated community in Union Township, Vanderburgh County, in the U.S. state of Indiana.

Geography

References

Unincorporated communities in Vanderburgh County, Indiana
Unincorporated communities in Indiana